Pulaski County High School may refer to:

Pulaski County High School (Kentucky) in Somerset, Kentucky
Pulaski County High School (Virginia) in Dublin, Virginia